Diplectanum is a genus of monopisthocotylean monogeneans in the family Diplectanidae. The genus, created by Karl Moriz Diesing, gave its name to the family Diplectanidae. All its species are parasites of the gill lamellae of teleosts.
The type-species of the genus is Diplectanum aequans (Wagener, 1857).

Species

According to the World Register of Marine Species, many species are included in this genus.
Examples are:

 Diplectanum aculeatum Parona & Perugia, 1889
 Diplectanum aequans (Wagener, 1857) 
 Diplectanum banyulense Oliver, 1968
 Diplectanum belengeri (Chauhan, 1945) Chauhan, 1954
 Diplectanum bocqueti Oliver, 1980
 Diplectanum chabaudi Oliver, 1980
 Diplectanum copiosum Boeger, Fehlauer & Marques, 2006
 Diplectanum dollfusi Oliver, 1980
 Diplectanum femineum Justine & Henry, 2010
 Diplectanum flagritubus Nagibina, 1976

References

Diplectanidae
Monogenea genera